Kathleen Laetitia "Kate" O'Connor (14 September 1876 – 24 August 1968) was an impressionist painter with a career in Western Australia and France. She was a daughter of the celebrated engineer C. Y. O'Connor.

Biography 
O'Connor was born in Hokitika, New Zealand the daughter of Charles Yelverton O'Connor and his wife Susan Laetitia O'Connor (née Ness). She was educated at Marsden School, Wellington and by private tuition in Perth from 1891, including lessons from artist Florence Fuller.

She studied painting in Perth Technical School under James Linton and at the Bushey School, England, under Hubert von Herkomer. She worked for a time in fashionable department stores in Sydney then moved to Paris, France where she lived (apart from the war years which she spent, miserably, in London) from 1907 to 1950.

She exhibited regularly at the Salon d'Automne in Paris from 1911 as well as the Salon Française and Société des Femmes Peintres et Sculpteurs. In Perth she frequently exhibited at the Claude Hotchin Galleries, including several one-woman shows.

She returned to Australia permanently in 1955, living in Perth, but reluctantly. She probably never forgave that city for the callous treatment her father received which led to his suicide. She resented being away from Paris but could no longer afford to live there; her work was no longer fashionable and her private sources of income had largely dried up. She maintained, as far as possible, a Parisian lifestyle and was considered to affect an air of superiority. She could not countenance being buried in Australian soil and had her ashes scattered over the sea.

She is represented in all Australian State galleries and, largely as a result of bequests by Sir Claude Hotchin, in most Western Australian regional galleries.

References

Sources 
McCulloch, Alan Encyclopaedia of Australian Art Hutchinson of London 1968

Further reading 
Hutchins, Patrick "Last Link with Impressionism" Bulletin, Sydney, 4 March 1967

External links 
 images of Kathleen O'Connor's paintings at the National Gallery of Australia
 images of Kathleen O'Connor's paintings at the Art Gallery of New South Wales

1876 births
1968 deaths
Australian women painters
Australian Impressionist painters
Australian people of Irish descent
People educated at Samuel Marsden Collegiate School
20th-century Australian women artists
20th-century Australian artists
New Zealand emigrants to Australia